The Circle Bar is a famous, historic bar and lounge on Main Street in Santa Monica, California, United States. It was established in 1949. Movieline named it one of the 10 best places for young actors to be seen at night.

References

Buildings and structures in Santa Monica, California
1949 establishments in California
Companies based in Santa Monica, California